Ahmednagar City Assembly constituency is one of the 288 Vidhan Sabha (Legislative Assembly) constituencies of Maharashtra state in Western India. This Assembly constituency is located in Ahmednagar district.

It is part of the Ahmednagar Lok Sabha constituency along with five other Vidhan Sabha segments, namely, Shevgaon, Rahuri, Parner, Shrigonda and Karjat Jamkhed.

Members of Legislative Assembly
 1985: Dadasaheb Dashrath Kalamkar, IC(S)
 1990: Anil Rathod, Shiv Sena
 1995: Anil Rathod, Shiv Sena
 1999: Anil Rathod, Shiv Sena
 2004: Anil Rathod, Shiv Sena
 2009: Anil Rathod, Shiv Sena
 2014: Sangram Arun Jagtap , NCP
2019: Sangram Arun Jagtap , NCP

See also
 Ahmednagar
 List of constituencies of Maharashtra Vidhan Sabha

References

Assembly constituencies of Maharashtra
Ahmednagar